The 2011–12 CCHL season is the 51st season of the Central Canada Hockey League (CCHL). The twelve teams of the CCHL played 62-game schedules.

In March 2012, the top teams of the league played down for the Bogart Cup, the CCHL championship.  The winner of the Bogart Cup competed in the Eastern Canadian Junior "A" championship, the Fred Page Cup.  If successful against the winners of the Quebec Junior AAA Hockey League and Maritime Hockey League, the champion would then move on to play in the Canadian Junior Hockey League championship, the 2012 Royal Bank Cup.  The Pembroke Lumber Kings of the CCHL were the defending League, Fred Page Cup, and Royal Bank Cup champions.

Changes 
None

Current Standings 
Note: GP = Games played; W = Wins; L = Losses; OTL = Overtime losses; SL = Shootout losses; GF = Goals for; GA = Goals against; PTS = Points; x = clinched playoff berth; y = clinched division title; z = clinched league title

Teams listed on the official league website.

Standings listed on official league website.

All-Star and Prospects Games
The league all-star game took place on December 26, 2011.  The teams were divided into "Yzerman's All-Stars" and "Robinson's All-Stars", along divisional lines.  The game was played in Smiths Falls, Ontario.

Result:

Yzerman's All-Stars 4 - Robinson's All-Stars 1

The league prospects games took place on December 29, 2011.  The teams were divided into "Yzerman's 95's" and "Robinson's 95's", along divisional lines.  The game, like the All-Star game, was played in Smiths Falls, Ontario.

Result:

Yzerman's 95's 7 - Robinson's 95's 2

2011-12 Bogart Cup Playoffs

Playoff results are listed on the official league website.

Fred Page Cup Championship
Hosted by the Kanata Stallions in Kanata, Ontario.  The Kanata Stallions finished in 3rd place, losing the semi-final.  The Nepean Raiders finished in 2nd place, losing the final.

Round Robin
Nepean Raiders beat Princeville Titans (QJAAAHL) 4-0
Woodstock Slammers (MHL) beat Kanata Stallions 4-3
Kanata Stallions beat Nepean Raiders 2-1 OT
Woodstock Slammers (MHL) beat Nepean Raiders 3-2
Kanata Stallions beat Princeville Titans (QJAAAHL) 7-4

Semi-final
Nepean Raiders beat Kanata Stallions 6-1

Final
Woodstock Slammers (MHL) beat Nepean Raiders 3-2

Scoring leaders 
Note: GP = Games played; G = Goals; A = Assists; Pts = Points; PIM = Penalty minutes

Leading goaltenders 
Note: GP = Games played; Mins = Minutes played; W = Wins; L = Losses: OTL = Overtime losses; SL = Shootout losses; GA = Goals Allowed; SO = Shutouts; GAA = Goals against average

Players selected in 2012 NHL Entry Draft
Rd 5 #147 Ben Hutton - Vancouver Canucks (Nepean Raiders)

Awards
League MVP – Craig Cowie (Nepean Raiders)
Rookie of the Year – Mackenzie Weegar (Nepean Raiders)
Most Outstanding Defenceman – Ryan Johnston (Nepean Raiders)
Sportsmanship and Ability Award – Matt Robertson (Smiths Falls Bears)
Most Outstanding Goaltender – Francis Dupuis (Pembroke Lumber Kings)
Team Lowest GAA – Lukas Hafner/Matt Jenkins (Cornwall Colts)
Top Midget Prospect – Mackenzie Weegar (Nepean Raiders)
Top Graduating Player – Craig Cowie (Nepean Raiders)
League Scoring Title – Craig Cowie (Nepean Raiders)

All-star event
The first annual Central Canada Junior A Challenge is an interleague all-star tournament hosted by Smiths Falls, Ontario. The event runs December 27–29, 2011.

See: Central Canada Cup Challenge.

See also 
 2012 Royal Bank Cup
 Fred Page Cup
 Quebec Junior AAA Hockey League
 Maritime Junior Hockey League
 2011 in ice hockey
 2012 in ice hockey

References

External links 
 Official website of the Central Hockey League
 Official website of the Canadian Junior Hockey League

CCHL
Central Canada Hockey League seasons